Oral Fixation, Vol. 1 & 2 is the first box set by Colombian singer and songwriter Shakira, released on 5 December 2006, by Epic Records. Released one year after her sixth and seventh studio albums Fijación Oral, Vol. 1 and Oral Fixation, Vol. 2, it includes both previous albums and an additional DVD with music videos and live performances. After attaining international success with her third studio effort, Laundry Service (2001), Shakira decided to create a two-part follow-up record. She released the project as the follow-up to her sixth studio effort Fijación Oral, Vol. 1, with which she had attained international success five months prior.

As co-producer, Shakira enlisted Rick Rubin as executive producer, also working with Gustavo Cerati, Lester Mendez, Luis F. Ochoa and Jose "Gocho" Torres. to work alongside newer partners Jerry Duplessis, Wyclef Jean, Tim Mitchell and The Matrix. Musically the album follows in the vein of her earlier works, the album is heavily influenced by Latin pop styles, and additionally incorporates elements of dance-pop, pop rock, and trip hop. The compilation peaked at numbers 13 and 27 on the Billboard Latin Pop Albums and Top Latin Albums charts.

Background
After attaining international success with her fifth studio effort Laundry Service in 2001, Shakira opted to create a Spanish-language project for her follow-up record, her first since her fourth studio album Dónde Están los Ladrones? in 1998. Having co-written nearly sixty tracks for Laundry Service, she put herself "on the mission of selecting [her] favorite ones" to record for Fijación Oral, Vol. 1 and its own successor, the English-language Oral Fixation Vol. 2. While recording the first volume, Shakira worked with previous collaborator Lester Mendez and new partners Gustavo Cerati, Luis F. Ochoa, and Jose "Gocho" Torres. Production of the second volume saw her reunited with Cerati, Mendez, and Ochoa and also joined by newer partners Jerry Duplessis, Wyclef Jean, Tim Mitchell, and The Matrix.

Artwork

For both Oral Fixation records, Shakira commented that the album artworks were inspired by Eve, elaborating that "[she wanted] to attribute to Eve one more reason to bite the forbidden fruit, and that would be her oral fixation" and that "[she always felt] that [she has] been a very oral person. [It is her] biggest source of pleasure". The second volume's cover sees an unclothed Shakira covered by a tree's branches and leaves while holding an apple in her hand. The baby girl she held in her arms on the cover of the first volume is sitting in the tree, alluding to psychoanalyst Sigmund Freud's theory that infants begin discovering the world through their mouths during the oral stage of psychosexual development.

For Jon Pareles of The New York Times, "For obvious reasons, it's eye-catching, as was the cover of the Spanish-language companion album, "Fijación Oral, Vol. 1". In Middle Easts version of the album, Shakira was covered up with leaves. Complex Magazine selected "Oral Fixation" album cover as the eleventh "sexiest album cover of all time", writing that it is "the hottest portrayal of Eve in the Garden of Eden we can imagine." Maxim also listed the album's cover as one of the "sexiest album covers", writing that, "A naked girl holding up an apple in a garden is played out, but not when the girl is hip-shaking Shakira. Damn, it could happen all over again, couldn't it?."

Music and lyrics

Volume one
Fijación Oral, Vol. 1 is a Latin pop album. The introductory track, "En Tus Pupilas" ("In Your Pupils"), incorporates folk music styles and its opening verse includes French-language lyrics. "La Pared" ("The Wall") has been compared stylistically to the 1980s duo Eurythmics. "La Tortura" ("The Torture") features Spanish singer-songwriter Alejandro Sanz, with elements of Colombian cumbia music, dancehall and electronica. "Obtener un Sí" ("Obtain a Yes") is a bossa nova song with cha-cha elements against an orchestral background. "Día Especial" ("Special Day") features Argentinean singer-songwriter Gustavo Cerati on guitar.

The sixth track, "Escondite Inglés", has a new wave feel. "No" also features Cerati on guitar, using a simple melody to emphasize Shakira's vocals. "Las de la Intuición" ("The Ones with the Intuition") has synthpop elements, while "Día de Enero" ("January Day") has been compared to Mexican singer-songwriter Natalia Lafourcade. "Lo Imprescindible" ("Bare Essentials") has  German-language verses in which Shakira lyrically expresses "Come baby come. Don't ever leave me". The disc concludes with an acoustic version of "La Pared" and the Shaketon remix of "La Tortura".

Volume two
For Stephen Thomas Erlewine of Allmusic, the album touches on everything from the expected Latin rhythms to glitzy Euro disco, trashy American rock & roll, and stomping Britpop, all punctuated by some stark confessionals. "How Do You Do" is a bold opening track that features Gregorian chants and an eerie reciting of "The Lord's Prayer" before thrusting the listener into a song similar to Sarah McLachlan's 'Dear God', according to Kristina Weise of Songwriting Universe. It presents bitter questions regarding faith and religion. The lyrics say, "How many people die and hurt in your name?/Hey does that make you proud, or does it bring you shame?" Shakira affirms, "I decided in the bridge of the song to include chants from different religions like Islam, Judaism and Christianity. And the three chanters are saying basically the same: they are asking for forgiveness," she said off the track. The first single, "Don't Bother", presents the final chapter of a relationship and the confusion that faces anyone in a break up. It includes the lyric lines, "For you I'd give up all I own and move to a communist country/If you came with me, of course/And I'd file my nails so they don't hurt you." She quickly follows with: "And after all I'm glad I am not your type/I promise you won't see me cry/So don't bother/I'll be fine, I'll be fine." For Shakira, "I think 'Don't Bother' has a lot of pain in it as a song, but also a lot of humor and sarcasm. Yes, it is a way of exorcising all of these feelings, a form of catharsis, getting rid of all of those emotions that torture us women at some point in our lives."

"Illegal" features a guitar solo by Mexican guitarist Carlos Santana, and features lyrics such as, "You said you would love me until you died/And as far as I know you're still alive", which were compared to "Alanis Morissette"'s "You Oughta Know", according to Stephen Thomas Erlewine of Allmusic. "I'd like to be the owner of the zipper on your jeans," she sings on the racy "Hey You," which was compared to the works of American rock-band No Doubt, by Slant Magazine. Mariachi horns bump up against surf guitars in "Animal City", a don't-go-there warning against fame and fake friends; while bossa nova accents wind through "Something", one of only two tracks reprised from Fijación Oral, being called En Tus Pupilas on the first edition. While "The Day and the Time" is on the first edition, with the title "Dia Especial". Meanwhile, gypsy-caravan violin and marauder guitar complete "Your Embrace," a teardroppy, adult-contemporary balladry, whilst "Costume Makes the Clown," talks about she cheating on her guy, over battering-ram guitars. Shakira also dives into pulsating neo-disco on the closing track "Timor", but in the form of a protest song.

Promotion

To further promote Fijación Oral, Vol. 1 and Oral Fixation, Vol. 2, Shakira embarked on the Oral Fixation Tour. It was launched on 14 June 2006, at the Feria De Muestras in Zaragoza, Spain. With the assistance of the Creative Artists Agency, she visited twenty-seven cities and performed forty-one shows across five continents. The tour concluded on 9 July 2007, at the Turkcell Kuruçeşme Arena in Istanbul, Turkey. It grossed over $42 million in North and Latin America, and grossed $100 million worldwide. The set list primarily consisted of Spanish-language tracks, and additionally included earlier singles from Shakira's albums Pies Descalzos (1996), Dónde Están los Ladrones? (1998), and Laundry Service (2001).

In November 2007, Epic Records released the Oral Fixation Tour live album, filmed during a show in Miami, Florida in December 2006. Robert Silva from About.com provided a positive review, describing the recording as a "very entertaining and lively performance"; he expressed an additional interest in the bonus behind-the-scenes footage. William Ruhlmann from Allmusic shared a similar sentiment, complimenting her vocals and dancing abilities.

Release
On 23 January 2007, Fijación Oral, Vol. 1 and Oral Fixation, Vol. 2 were released as a three-disc box set, titled Oral Fixation, Vol. 1 & 2. Each record was on a separate disc, and was packaged with a DVD featuring music videos and live recordings of album tracks. The compilation peaked at numbers 13 and 27 on the Billboard Latin Pop Albums and Top Latin Albums charts.

Track listing
Credits adapted from the liner notes of Fijación Oral, Vol. 1 and Oral Fixation, Vol. 2.

Personnel
Credits are adapted from Allmusic.

David Alsina  – bandoneon
Gelipe Alvarez  – programming
Gian Arias  – programming
Paul Bushnell  – bajo sexto
Jorge Calandrelli  – metales, orchestra director, string arrangements
Juan Camatano  – assistant engineer
Dave Carpenter  – bajo sexto
Gustavo Celis  – mixing
Gustavo Cerati  – composer, guest artist, guitar, keyboard, primary artist, producer, programming
Chris Chaney  – bajo sexto
Luis Conte  – percussion
Pete Davis  – keyboards, programming, trumpet
Bruce Dukov
Gary Foster  – flute
Bryan Gallant  – assistant engineer
Iker Gastaminza  – engineer
Danny George  – project coordinator
Serban Ghenea  – mixing
Mauricio Guerrero  – engineer, mixing
Victor Indrizzo  – bateria, percussion
Rob Jacobs  – engineer, mixing
Humberto (Kiro) Judex  – accordion
Steve Kajula  – flute
Ben Kaplan  – assistant engineer
Kevin Killen  – engineer
Tim LeBlanc  – engineer
Charles Loper  – trombone
Warren Luening  – flugelhorn
Terry Manning  – engineer
Maria Paula Marulanda  – art direction
David Massey  – A&R
Farra Mathews  – A&R
Bob McChensay  – trombone
Vlado Meller  – mastering
Lester Mendez  – composer, keyboards, producer, programming
Frank Marocco  – accordion
Jonathan Mover  – bateria
Teddy Mulet  – trumpet
Luis Fernando Ochoa  – composer
Carlos Paucar  – engineer
Shawn Pelton  – bateria, percussion
Archie Pena  – percussion
Tony Reyes  – guitar, keyboards
Rick Rubin  – executive producer
Alejandro Sanz  – composer, guest artist, guitar, primary artist, tres Cubano, vocal arrangement
Shakira  – composer, vocals
Mario Sorrenti  – photography
Ramón Stagnaro  – guitar
Rene Toledo  – guitar
José DeJesús Rosales "Halcón Dorado" Torres  – production assistant, programming, remixing
Dave Way  – mixing
Joe Wohlmuth  – engineer
Lyle Workman  – guitar
Rita Quintero  - background vocals/arranger
Emmanuel Cauvet  - drums & programming

Charts

References

Fijacion Oral, Vol. 1 Oral Fixation, Vol. 2
Albums produced by Rick Rubin
2006 compilation albums
2006 video albums
Music video compilation albums
Epic Records compilation albums